Tuffy Latour may refer to
Tuffield A. Latour (1909–1965), American Olympic bobsledder 
Tuffield Latour (born c. 1968), American bobsledder, grandson of Tuffield A. Latour